Raymond Joseph "Ray" Veall (born 16 March 1943) is an English former professional footballer who played as a left winger for Doncaster Rovers, Everton, Preston North End and Huddersfield Town in the Football League during the 1960s. He also played for the Los Angeles Wolves in the North American Soccer League.

References

External links
 

1943 births
Living people
People from Skegness
English footballers
Association football wingers
Skegness Town A.F.C. players
Doncaster Rovers F.C. players
Everton F.C. players
Preston North End F.C. players
Huddersfield Town A.F.C. players
Los Angeles Wolves players
Maritzburg F.C. players
Gisborne City AFC players
English Football League players
North American Soccer League (1968–1984) players
English expatriate sportspeople in the United States
Expatriate soccer players in the United States
English expatriate footballers